The IPD Periquito (Brazilian name for the parakeet bird), was a single-seat sailplane of high-wing construction designed in 1956 by Guido Pessotti in Brazil.

It had a wooden construction, with a plywood and canvas covering. Little conventional train, with fixed center skate and fixed drumstick, half-embedded. There was also a fixed skate on the tail.

Variants 
Periquito I Developed at the Institute of Aeronautics and Space, São José dos Campos, São Paulo, was designed to fulfill the following requirements as indicated in order of priority. One built.
Periquito II Evolution of the Periquito I, this glider made its first flight in 1957 and was put into production in 1959. Eight were built.

Specifications (Periquito II)

See also
 List of Brazilian gliders

Notes

References

1950s Brazilian sailplanes
Aircraft first flown in 1957
Periquito
High-wing aircraft